The 2021–22 Women's Senior T20 Trophy was the 13th edition of the Women's Senior T20 Trophy, the domestic women's T20 competition in India. The tournament was originally scheduled to be played from 19 March to 11 April 2022, but was postponed on 5 January 2022 due to rising COVID-19 cases in the country. The tournament took place from 15 April to 4 May 2022, with 37 teams divided into six groups. In the first round of the tournament, Nagaland player Kiran Navgire scored an unbeaten 162 against Arunachal Pradesh. Railways, the defending champions, beat Maharashtra in the final to win their tenth T20 title.

Competition format
37 teams competed in the tournament, divided into the Elite Group and the Plate Group, with the teams in the Elite Group further divided into Groups A, B, C, D and E. Each group took place in one host city, under COVID-19 protocols. The top two teams in each Elite Group progressed to the knockout stages, along with the top team from the Plate Group. The five Elite Group winners progressed straight to the quarter-finals, whilst the remaining six teams competed in the pre-quarter-finals.

The groups worked on a points system with positions within the groups being based on the total points. Points were awarded as follows:

Win: 4 points. 
Tie: 2 points. 
Loss: 0 points. 
No Result/Abandoned: 2 points.

If points in the final table were equal, teams were separated by most wins, then head-to-head record, then Net Run Rate.

League stage

Points tables

Elite Group A

Host - Puducherry

Elite Group B

Host - Kerala (Trivandrum)

Elite Group C

Host - Saurashtra (Rajkot)

Elite Group D

Host - Punjab (Mohali)

Elite Group E

Host - Jharkhand (Ranchi)

Plate Group

Host - Assam (Guwahati)

 Advanced to the quarter-finals.
 Advanced to the pre-quarter-finals.

Fixtures

Elite Group A

Elite Group B

Elite Group C

Elite Group D

Elite Group E

Plate Group

Knockout stages

Pre-quarter-finals

Quarter-finals

Semi-finals

Final

Statistics

Most runs

Source: BCCI

Most wickets

Source: BCCI

References

Women's Senior T20 Trophy
Domestic cricket competitions in 2021–22
2022 in Indian cricket